is a 1997 Japanese adventure video game developed by Zeque. Set in the Kowloon Walled City in Hong Kong, it is considered a cult hit.

Plot
On June 22, 1997, before the handover of Hong Kong, the demolished Kowloon Walled City reemerged from the realm of Yin (陰界) back to the streets of Hong Kong in the living realm of Yang (陽界). The Hong Kong Supreme Feng Shui Conference (香港最高風水会議) determined that the reappearance of the walled city was a sign of an imbalance of the Yin and Yang, and if the two parallel worlds are not separated once again, great calamity would occur. To set things straight, the order of Feng Shui would need to be re-instilled in the realm of Yin. Thus the protagonist, a Super Feng Shui Practitioner (超級風水師), was sent into the Kowloon Walled City to seek and awaken the Four Symbols so that order would be revived.

Development 
The game was developed by Zeque, who also co-developed Planet Laika.

It was released for the PlayStation in Japan on February 28, 1997, and re-released for the PlayStation Network on April 14, 2010.

Reception 
Famitsu gave the game a score of 26 out of 40.

Critic Shin Muramatsu drew on his experience with the game's "Hong Kong Gothic" version of the Walled City to compare the past and future of Hong Kong itself.

Though never released abroad, Kowloon's Gate was a cult hit in Japan. It ultimately sold 135,000 units in the region. In the video game magazine Famitsu, a 2009 reader poll of games with highest demand for a sequel ranked the game tenth with 151 votes.

Sequel
In November 2019, a sequel, Kowloon's Rhizome: A Day of the Fire, was announced. As of October 2020, a Fall 2021 release was planned for Nintendo Switch, PlayStation 4 and Microsoft Windows in Japan.

See also
Shenmue

References

External links

 Game website 

1997 video games
Adventure games
Japan-exclusive video games
PlayStation (console) games
PlayStation Network games
Video games developed in Japan
Video games scored by Kuniaki Haishima
Video games set in Hong Kong
Single-player video games